Azhaggiye Thee (Tamil: அழகிய தீ) is a 2019 Malaysian Tamil-language drama film. It tells the story of a young lady from rural estate who moves to Kuala Lumpur in hopes of better living, but has to goes through financial hard times and family problems. It is released on 27 June 2019 in Malaysia.

Synopsis 
Ananthi (Latha), is a 20-year-old girl living in the estates of Slim River, Perak. She is the youngest of three siblings and the family is poor. After suffering tragic loss, she moves to Kuala Lumpur in hopes for a better living. She received support and makes new friends, including Bala (Saresh D7) and just when things starts to turn good, financial and family problems soon arises. It is based on true events.

Cast 
 Saresh D7
 Latha (Now she starring in Devi Adi Parashakti)
 Guna
 Kokila
 Yuvaraj Krishnaswamy
Ruban

References

External links 
 

Tamil-language Malaysian films
Malaysian drama films
2010s Tamil-language films